First Commission of the House of Representatives, more commonly known as First Commission, is one of eleven commissions for the 2019–2024 period, within the People's Representative Council of Indonesia. The commission has the scope of tasks in the fields of defense, foreign affairs, communications and informatics, and intelligence.

Legal basis 

 Law Number 17 of 2014 concerning the People's Consultative Assembly, the People's Representative Council, the Regional Representative Council, and the Regional People's Representative Council.
 Regulation of the House of Representatives of the Republic of Indonesia Number 1 of 2014 concerning Orders jo. DPR RI Regulation Number 3 of 2015 concerning Amendments to the Regulation of the House of Representatives of the Republic of Indonesia Number 1 of 2014.

Duties 
Like other commissions, the First Commission has duties in the fields of:

 Legislating
 Budgeting
 Superivision

Membership

Composition 
There are 53 members of First Commission, with the following composition :

Leadership

Members

References 

Commissions of the People's Representative Council